Nawab Ali Wassan (born 1 August 1974) is a Pakistani politician who had been a member of the National Assembly of Pakistan, from 2008 to May 2018.

Early life
He was born on 1 August 1974 in Khairpur, Pakistan.

Political career

He was elected to the National Assembly of Pakistan as a candidate of Pakistan Peoples Party (PPP) from Constituency NA-215 (Khairpur-I) in 2008 Pakistani general election. He received 98,782 votes and defeated Syed Javed Ali Shah Jillani, a candidate of Pakistan Muslim League (F) (PML-F).

He was re-elected to the National Assembly as a candidate of PPP from Constituency NA-215 (Khairpur-I) in 2013 Pakistani general election. He received 91,809 votes and defeated Ghous Ali Shah.

References

Living people
Pakistan People's Party politicians
Sindhi people
Pakistani MNAs 2013–2018
People from Sindh
1974 births
Pakistani MNAs 2008–2013